The 76 mm air defense gun M1931 was an anti-aircraft gun used by the Soviet Union during the Winter War and the first stages of World War II.

History
The configuration of the air defense gun M1931 owed much to the design of the contemporary Vickers 3-inch anti-aircraft guns.  The Soviet M1931 like the Vickers gun had a two-wheeled carriage with collapsible cruciform outriggers.

The M1931 was replaced in production in 1938 by the 76 mm air defense gun M1938 which had a four-wheeled dual-axle carriage with two collapsible outriggers.  The M1931 and M1938 had nearly identical performance and were gradually replaced by the more powerful 85 mm air defense gun M1939.

A number of M1931 guns were captured by Finland during the Winter War and were employed by them as the 76 ItK/31 ss during World War II.  Likewise, M1931 guns captured by the Germans were given the designation 7.62 cm Flak M.31(r) and used until they were either worn out or their ammunition supply ran out.  A few were rebored to fire German 8.8 cm ammunition and redesignated the 7.62/8.8 cm Flak M.31(r).  However, the majority were scrapped in 1944.

After the war, a number of Finnish guns were converted into light coastal guns (76 ItK 31 Rt, where "Rt" stands for "rannikkotykistö" = coastal artillery) by the addition of a scope site with manual lead mechanism for direct fire against moving surface targets. These guns were still in use as training guns of the coastal artillery into the 1980s.

Photo Gallery

Notes

References
 Shunkov V. N. - The Weapons of the Red Army, Mn. Harvest, 1999 (Шунков В. Н. - Оружие Красной Армии. — Мн.: Харвест, 1999.)

External links
 http://www.quarryhs.co.uk/ammotable9.html 
 http://www.jaegerplatoon.net/AA_GUNS3.htm

Anti-aircraft guns of the Soviet Union
World War II artillery of the Soviet Union
World War II anti-aircraft guns
76 mm artillery
Military equipment introduced in the 1930s